Jovane Silva Guissone (born 11 March 1983) is a Paralympic épée and foil fencer from Brazil. He competed at the 2012 and 2016 Paralympics and won a gold medal in the individual épée in 2012.

Guissone lost control of his legs after being shot in 2004. In 2008 he took up wheelchair fencing, and in 2014 was named Top Paralympic Performer of the Year at the 2014 Brazilian Paralympic Awards in Copacabana. Guissone is married and has a son.

References

Brazilian male épée fencers
Brazilian male foil fencers
Paralympic wheelchair fencers of Brazil
1983 births
Living people
Wheelchair fencers at the 2012 Summer Paralympics
Wheelchair fencers at the 2016 Summer Paralympics
Paralympic gold medalists for Brazil
Medalists at the 2012 Summer Paralympics
Paralympic medalists in wheelchair fencing
Wheelchair fencers at the 2020 Summer Paralympics
Medalists at the 2020 Summer Paralympics
21st-century Brazilian people
20th-century Brazilian people